The 2022 Everest Canadian Curling Club Championships were held from November 21 to 26 at the Ice Palace at the West Edmonton Mall in Edmonton, Alberta. The event is the Canadian championship for "club-level" curling, that is for curlers who are not currently playing at the high performance level.   

The event was originally supposed to begin on November 20 but was delayed a day due to an ice installation issue. This was the first curling event held at the West Edmonton Mall since the 1996 West Edmonton Mall Curling Classic, a World Curling Tour event that lasted two seasons.

The winning teams will participate in the 2023 PointsBet Invitational tournament.

Men

Teams
The teams are listed as follows:

Round-robin standings
Final round-robin standings

Round-robin results

All draws are listed in Mountain Time (UTC−07:00).

Draw 1
Monday, November 21, 12:30 pm

Draw 2
Monday, November 21, 4:00 pm

Draw 3
Monday, November 21, 7:30 pm

Draw 4
Tuesday, November 22, 9:00 am

Draw 5
Tuesday, November 22, 12:30 pm

Draw 6
Tuesday, November 22, 4:00 pm

Draw 7
Tuesday, November 22, 7:30 pm

Draw 8
Wednesday, November 23, 9:00 am

Draw 9
Wednesday, November 23, 12:30 pm

Draw 11
Wednesday, November 23, 7:30 pm

Draw 12
Thursday, November 24, 9:00 am

Draw 13
Thursday, November 24, 12:30 pm

Draw 14
Thursday, November 24, 4:00 pm

Draw 15
Thursday, November 24, 7:30 pm

Championship round

A Bracket

B Bracket

A Event

Semifinals
Friday, November 25, 11:00 am

Finals
Friday, November 25, 5:00 pm

B Event

Semifinals
Friday, November 25, 5:00 pm

Finals
Friday, November 25, 9:00 pm

Playoffs

Semifinals
Saturday, November 26, 10:00 am

Bronze medal game
Saturday, November 26, 3:30 pm

Gold medal game
Saturday, November 26, 3:30 pm

Women

Teams
The teams are listed as follows:

Round-robin standings
Final round-robin standings

Round-robin results

All draws are listed in Mountain Time (UTC−07:00).

Draw 1
Monday, November 21, 12:30 pm

Draw 2
Monday, November 21, 4:00 pm

Draw 3
Monday, November 21, 7:30 pm

Draw 4
Tuesday, November 22, 9:00 am

Draw 5
Tuesday, November 22, 12:30 pm

Draw 6
Tuesday, November 22, 4:00 pm

Draw 7
Tuesday, November 22, 7:30 pm

Draw 8
Wednesday, November 23, 9:00 am

Draw 10
Wednesday, November 23, 4:00 pm

Draw 11
Wednesday, November 23, 7:30 pm

Draw 12
Thursday, November 24, 9:00 am

Draw 13
Thursday, November 24, 12:30 pm

Draw 14
Thursday, November 24, 4:00 pm

Championship round

A Bracket

B Bracket

A Event

Semifinals
Friday, November 25, 8:00 am

Finals
Friday, November 25, 2:00 pm

B Event

Semifinals
Friday, November 25, 2:00 pm

Finals
Friday, November 25, 9:00 pm

Playoffs

Semifinals
Saturday, November 26, 10:00 am

Bronze medal game
Saturday, November 26, 3:30 pm

Gold medal game
Saturday, November 26, 3:30 pm

References

External links

2022 in Canadian curling
2022 in Alberta
Canadian Curling Club
Curling competitions in Edmonton
Canadian Curling Club Championships